
The Aero Boero AB-150 is an Argentine civil utility aircraft, developed in parallel with the AB-180 as a lower-cost, lower-powered version of that aircraft. Like the 180, it was produced by Aero Boero in long-range and agricultural variants.

Variants
 AB-150 Ag :At least five built
 AB-150 RV :Orders for the AB-150RV were transferred to the Aero Boero AB-180RV

Specifications (AB-150 Ag)

See also
Related development: 
Aero Boero AB-180

References

Notes

Bibliography

High-wing aircraft
Single-engined tractor aircraft
Aero Boero aircraft
1960s Argentine civil utility aircraft